The Tupolev Tu-160 (NATO reporting name: Blackjack) is a supersonic, variable-sweep wing heavy strategic bomber designed by the Tupolev Design Bureau in the Soviet Union in the 1970s. It is the largest and heaviest Mach 2+ supersonic military aircraft ever built and second to the experimental XB-70 Valkyrie in overall length and top speed. As of 2022, it is the largest and heaviest combat aircraft, the fastest bomber in use and the largest and heaviest variable-sweep wing airplane ever flown.

Entering service in 1987, the Tu-160 was the last strategic bomber designed for the Soviet Union. Following the dissolution of the Soviet Union, the newly independent Ukraine inherited a fleet of 19 Tu-160s, over half of all aircraft in existence at that time. Following protracted negotiations, 11 Ukrainian Tu-160s were purchased by the Russian Federation while the remainder were scrapped in the late 1990s under the Nunn–Lugar Cooperative Threat Reduction agreement. Following these actions, the sole operator of the type is the Russian Air Force's Long Range Aviation branch, which had 16 Tu-160s in service by 2016. The type had its combat debut in November 2015 during the Russian military intervention in the Syrian Civil War, conducting numerous airstrikes using Kh-101 air-launched cruise missiles. Various overseas deployments have been conducted, including to distant nations such as Venezuela and South Africa.

Since the early 2000s, the active fleet has been subject to several upgrades, largely focusing on various electronics systems. The Tu-160M modernization program of existing models begun with the first updated aircraft delivered in December 2014. Plans announced in 2015 called for the delivery of 50 new-build Tu-160Ms as well as the upgrading of 16 existing aircraft. In January 2022, the first serial-built TU-160M made a test flight, with two planned for delivery in 2022 from 10 on order.

Development

Origins

The first competition for a supersonic strategic heavy bomber was launched in the Soviet Union in 1967. In 1972, the Soviet Union launched a new multi-mission bomber competition to create a new supersonic, variable-geometry ("swing-wing") heavy bomber with a maximum speed of Mach 2.3, in response to the US Air Force B-1 bomber project. The Tupolev design, named Aircraft 160M, with a lengthened blended wing layout and incorporating some elements of the Tu-144, competed against the Myasishchev M-18 and the Sukhoi T-4 designs. Work on the new Soviet bomber continued despite an end to the B-1A and in the same year, the design was accepted by the government committee. The prototype was photographed by an airline passenger at a Zhukovsky Airfield in November 1981, about a month before the aircraft's first flight on 18 December 1981. Production was authorized in 1984, beginning at the Kazan Aircraft Production Association (KAPO).

Modernization
In 2002, the Russian Defence Ministry and KAPO agreed to modernise all 15 Tu-160s. In July 2006, the first overhauled and partially modernized aircraft was accepted into Russian service after testing; it reportedly received the capability to use conventional weapons but was not upgraded with new avionics as previously planned. The first modernized aircraft capable of carrying the new long-range Kh-555 conventional cruise missile was delivered to the Russian Air Force in April 2008; a follow-up contract for the modernization of three more aircraft is estimated to cost RUR3.4 billion (US$103 million).

The modernization appeared to be split into two phases, first concentrating on life extension with some initial communication–navigation updates, followed by engine upgrades after 2016. In November 2014, a Tu-160 upgraded with new radar and avionics performed its first flight. The aircraft was delivered to the Russian Air Force as the Tu-160M model in December 2014. The phase I update was due to be completed by 2016, but industrial limitations may delay it to 2019 or beyond. Although Kuznetsov designed an NK-32M engine with improved reliability over the NK-32 engines, its successor company has struggled to deliver working units. Metallist-Samara JSC had not produced new engines for a decade when it was given a contract in 2011 to overhaul 26 of the existing engines; two years later, only four had been finished. Ownership and financial concerns hinder the prospects of a new production line; the firm insists it needs a minimum of 20 engines ordered per year but the government is only prepared to pay for 4–6 engines per year. A further improved engine was bench tested in 2012 and projected to potentially enter production as early as 2016.

On 2 February 2020, the modernized Tu-160M performed its first test flight at the airfield of the Kazan Aviation Plant named for I. Gorbunov. Deliveries started later that year, five aircraft were equipped with the new engines by August 2022.

Resumed production

In 2008, Russia revealed plans for one new Tu-160 to be delivered every one to two years with the aim of increasing the active inventory to 30 or more aircraft by 2025–2030. On 29 April 2015, Russian Defense Minister Sergei Shoigu, on order of President Putin, announced that Tu-160 production would resume. In May 2015, TASS reported that the Russian Air Force would purchase at least 50 KAPO-built Tu-160s. General Viktor Bondarev stated that development of the PAK DA will proceed alongside Tu-160 production.

On 16 November 2017, a newly assembled Tu-160, built from an unfinished airframe, was unveiled during a roll-out ceremony at KAPO, signifying a restoration of certain production techniques such as electron-beam welding or titanium work reportedly lost after the termination of serial production in 1992. According to Dmitri Rogozin, the serial production of wholly new airframes for the modernized Tu-160M2 should begin in 2019 with deliveries to the Russian Air Force in 2023. The aircraft, named Petr Deinekin, after the first commanding officer of the Russian Air Force, performed its maiden flight in January 2018 and began flight testing the same month. It performed its first public flight on 25 January 2018, during President Vladimir Putin's visit to KAPO plant. The same day, a contract for ten upgraded Tu-160M2s was signed. On 12 January 2022 a new-build Tu-160M had its first low altitude basic test flight. It is planned to deliver two new-build Tu-160M in 2022 with production increasing until all 50 on order new aircraft are delivered. In December 2022, United Aircraft Corporation announced that the second new-build Tu-160M and the fourth modernized Tu-160M were starting flight tests. It was also reported that the first new Tu-160 had completed factory testing.

Other proposed variants

A demilitarized, commercial version of the Tu-160, named Tu-160SK, was displayed at Asian Aerospace in Singapore in 1994 with a model of a small space vehicle named Burlak attached underneath the fuselage.

In January 2018, Vladimir Putin, while visiting the KAPO plant, floated an idea of creating a civilian passenger supersonic transport version of Tu-160. Experts quoted by the news media were skeptical about the commercial and technological feasibility of such a civilian conversion.

Design

The Tu-160 is a variable-geometry wing aircraft. The aircraft employs a fly-by-wire control system with a blended wing profile, and full-span slats are used on the leading edges, with double-slotted flaps on the trailing edges and cruciform tail. Titanium constitutes around 30% of the aircraft's  empty weight, and the largest component (the swing wing hinge) weighs . The Tu-160 has a crew of four (pilot, co-pilot, bombardier, and defensive systems operator) in K-36LM ejection seats.

The Tu-160 is powered by four Kuznetsov NK-32 afterburning turbofan engines, the most powerful ever fitted to a combat aircraft. Unlike the American B-1B Lancer, which reduced the original Mach 2+ requirement for the B-1A to achieve a smaller radar cross-section, the Tu-160 retains variable intake ramps, and is capable of reaching Mach 2.05 speed at altitude. The Tu-160 is equipped with a probe-and-drogue in-flight refueling system for extended-range missions, although it is rarely used. In February 2008, Tu-160 bombers and Il-78 refueling tankers practiced air refueling during air combat exercise, as well as MiG-31, A-50 and other Russian combat aircraft.

The aircraft carries a TsNPO Leninets Obzor-K (Survey, NATO: Clam Pipe) radar for tracking ground and air targets, and a separate Sopka Terrain-following radar. Although the Tu-160 was designed for reduced detectability to both radar and infrared signature, it is not a stealth aircraft.

Weapons are carried in two internal bays, each capable of holding  of free-fall weapons or a rotary launcher for nuclear missiles; additional missiles may also be carried externally. No defensive weapons are provided; the Tu-160 is the first post-World War II Soviet bomber to lack such defenses. In 2020, officials stated that the Russian Air Force is planning to arm the Tu-160 with new hypersonic missiles, in particular the Kh-47M2 Kinzhal.

While similar in appearance to the American B-1 Lancer, the Tu-160 is a different class of combat aircraft; its primary role being a standoff missile platform (strategic missile carrier). The Tu-160 is also larger and faster than the B-1B and has a slightly greater combat range, though the B-1B has a larger combined payload with external payload. Another noticeable difference is that the B-1's colour scheme is usually subdued dark gray to reduce visibility; the Tu-160 is painted with anti-flash white, giving it the nickname among Russian airmen "White Swan".

Operational history

In April 1987, the Tu-160 entered operational service with the 184th Guards Heavy Bomber Regiment located at Pryluky, Ukrainian SSR. The regiment, previously operating Tu-16 and Tu-22M3 strategic bombers, was the first unit to receive the Tu-160. Squadron deployments to Long Range Aviation began that same month. The Tu-160's first public appearance in a parade came in 1989. During 1989 and 1990, a total of 44 world speed flight records in its weight class were set. In January 1992, Boris Yeltsin decided to end serial production of the Tu-160; 35 aircraft were completed by this time. Russia also unilaterally suspended flights of strategic aviation over remote regions.

A total of 19 Tu-160s were based inside the newly independent Ukraine during the dissolution of the Soviet Union. On 25 August 1991, the Ukrainian parliament decreed that the new nation would take control of all military units on its territory; a Defence Ministry was created that same day. By the mid-1990s, the Pryluky regiment had lost its value as a combat unit; 19 Tu-160s were effectively grounded due to a lack of technical support and spare parts. Ukraine considered the Tu-160s to be a bargaining chip in economic negotiations with Russia and of limited military value. While Russian experts, who examined the aircraft at the Pryluky Air Base in 1993 and 1996, assessed their technical condition as good, the US$3 billion price proposed by Ukraine was considered by Russia to be unacceptable. In April 1998, amid stalled negotiations, Ukraine decided to commence scrapping the fleet under the Nunn–Lugar Cooperative Threat Reduction agreement. In November, the first Tu-160 was deconstructed at Pryluky.

In April 1999, Russia resumed talks with Ukraine, proposing to purchase eight Tu-160 and three Tu-95MS bombers manufactured in 1991 (those in the best technical condition), as well as 575 Kh-55SM cruise missiles. An agreement was reached and a US$285 million contract was signed, the value of which was deducted from Ukraine's debt for natural gas. On 20 October 1999, a group of Russian military experts went to Ukraine to prepare the aircraft for the flight to Engels-2 air base. On 5 November, the first two aircraft, a Tu-160 and a Tu-95MS, departed Pryluky. During the following months, the balance were flown to Engels-2.

Alongside buying Ukrainian Tu-160s, Russia pursued other means to expanding its fleet. In June 1999, the Russian Defence Ministry and KAPO signed a contract for a delivery of a single near-complete bomber. Named Aleksandr Molodchiy, it was the second aircraft in the eighth production batch. It arrived at Engels-2 on 10 September and was commissioned into service on 5 May 2000. The unit operating the fleet from Engels-2 was the 121st Guards Heavy Bomber Regiment which was formed up in early 1992 and received six aircraft by 1994. By the end of February 2001, the fleet stood at 15 with the addition of the eight Ukrainian Tu-160s and the new-build. The fleet was reduced to 14 due to the crash of the Mikhail Gromov during flight trials of a replacement engine on 18 September 2003. On 5 July 2006, a Tu-160 named Valentin Bliznyuk, named after the Tu-160's chief designer, entered service with the Russian Air Force after completing its overhaul, bringing the total number back to 15. Built in 1986, it was formerly used as a test aircraft by Tupolev.

On 22 April 2006, the then commander of the Long-Range Aviation Lieutenant General Igor Khvorov reported a pair of Tu-160s flew undetected through a US-controlled sector during a military exercise in the Arctic.

On 17 August 2007, Russian President Vladimir Putin announced the resumption of strategic aviation flights stopped in 1991. On 14 September 2007, British and Norwegian fighters intercepted two Tu-160s in international airspace near the United Kingdom and Finland, as they were patrolling the North Atlantic. On 25 December 2007, two Danish Air Force F-16s were scrambled to intercept two Tu-160s near Danish airspace.

On 11 September 2007, according to Russian government sources, a Tu-160 deployed a massive fuel-air explosive device, called Father of All Bombs, for its first field test. Some US military analysts expressed skepticism that the weapon was actually delivered by a Tu-160.

On 28 December 2007, a new Tu-160 named Vitaly Kopylov performed its first flight. The bomber joined the Russian Air Force on 29 April 2008, increasing the total number of aircraft in service to 16.

In early 2008, Tu-160s took part in an exercise with the Russian Navy in the Atlantic Ocean.

On 10 September 2008, two Tu-160s made an unprecedented deployment to Russia's ally Venezuela as part of military manoeuvres amid increasingly tense relations between Russia and the United States. The Russian Defence Ministry said Vasily Senko and Aleksandr Molodchiy would conduct training flights over neutral waters before returning to Russia. They were escorted by NATO fighters as they crossed the Atlantic Ocean.

On 12 October 2008, Tu-160s were involved in the largest Russian strategic bomber exercise since 1984. A total of 12 bombers including Tu-160 and Tu-95 aircraft conducted a series of launches of their cruise missiles. Some bombers launched a full complement of missiles. It was the first time that a Tu-160 had ever fired a full complement of missiles.

In August 2011, Russian media claimed that only four of the sixteen Tu-160s were flight worthy. Flight International reported eleven were combat-ready by mid-2012; between 2011 and 2013, eleven were observed in flight.

On 1 November 2013, Aleksandr Golovanov and Aleksandr Novikov entered Colombian airspace on two separate occasions while flying from Venezuela to Nicaragua. Noting a lack of clearance, the Colombian government issued a letter of protest to the Russian government after the first violation. In the second violation, two Colombian Air Force IAI Kfirs stationed at Barranquilla intercepted and escorted the two Tu-160s out of Colombian airspace.

On 17 November 2015, as part of the Russian military intervention in the Syrian Civil War, several Tu-160 and Tu-95MS long-range strategic bombers of the Russian Air Force carried out airstrikes at in Idlib and Aleppo provinces using the Kh-101 air-launched cruise missiles fired from the Mediterranean. In total, between 34 and 83 cruise missiles were fired, destroying 14 important targets. In addition, Tu-22M3 strategic bombers hit numerous claimed IS targets with unguided ammunition. This also marked the combat debut for the Tu-160 and Tu-95MS.

In August 2018, a number of Russian military aircraft including two Tu-160, Tu-95MS strategic bombers and Il-78 aerial tankers were deployed for the first time to the Russian Far East as part of a long-range tactical flight exercise, flying 7,000 km non-stop flight from their home base in Saratov Oblast to Chukotka. During the exercise, the crews practised combat use of cruise missiles at the Komi Test Range and performed aerial refueling.

In November 2018, a modernized Tu-160M test-fired a full complement of 12 Kh-101 cruise missiles at the Pemboi Test Range in the northeastern region of Komi Republic.

On 10 December 2018, two Tu-160s accompanied by an An-124 cargo plane and an Il-62 passenger plane, landed at the Maiquetía airport in Venezuela. On 23 October 2019, two Tu-160s accompanied by an An-124 and an Il-62 visited South Africa as part of strengthening ties between the two nations; the aircraft performed a 13 hours non-stop flight over the Caspian Sea, Arabian Sea, and Indian Ocean, covering  with mid-air refueling and landed at Waterkloof Air Force Base in South Africa. It was the Tu-160's first visit to the African continent.

On 19 September 2020, two Tu-160s set a world record for the range and duration of a non-stop flight for aircraft of this class. They were in the air for more than 25 hours, covering over 20 thousand kilometers, and was flown airspace over the neutral waters of the central part of the Arctic and Pacific oceans and the Kara, Laptev, East Siberian, Chukchi, and Barents seas.

On 11 November 2021, the Belarusian Defense Ministry announced that two Russian Tu-160s flew on a training mission over Belarus alongside Belarusian Air Force Sukhoi Su-30s.

The type was involved in the 2022 Russian invasion of Ukraine. According to Ukrainian sources, on 6 March 2022, a Tu-160 along with a Tu-95MS strategic bomber launched eight cruise missiles, presumably the Kh-101, at the Havryshivka Vinnytsia International Airport from the Black Sea area. On 26 June 2022, Ukrainian Air Force spokesman Yurii Ihnat reported four to six Kh-101 cruise missiles were launched by Tu-160 and Tu-95MS bombers at Kyiv from the Caspian Sea area.

Potential operators 

In 2022, retired Air Chief Marshal Anoop Raha revealed in response to a question that India was interested in purchasing Tu-160s. Reports have emerged that India is in talks with Russia to acquire six Tu-160s that will make India the only country other than US, Russia and China to have operational strategic bombers.

Variants

Tu-160 Production version.
Tu-160SDesignation used for serial Tu-160s when needed to separate them from all the pre-production and experimental aircraft.
Tu-160V Proposed liquid hydrogen fueled version (see also Tu-155).
Tu-160 NK-74 Proposed upgraded (extended range) version with NK-74 engines.
Tu-160M Upgraded version that features new weaponry, improved electronics and avionics, which significantly improves its combat effectiveness.
Tu-160P (Tu-161) Proposed very long-range escort fighter/interceptor version.
Tu-160PP Proposed electronic warfare version carrying stand-off jamming and ECM gear.
Tu-160R Proposed strategic reconnaissance version.
Tu-160SK Proposed commercial version, designed to launch satellites via the "Burlak" ("hauler") launch system.
Tu-160M2 Highly upgraded version featuring low observable coatings, new avionics, electronics, glass cockpit, communications and control systems, and a number of new weapons, as well as new more powerful and efficient engines giving it greater operational range. It will also have a new defensive system protecting it from incoming missiles. The first plane was to be ready by late 2021.

Operators

Current operators

 Russian Aerospace Forces
 Russian Air Force – 16 Tu-160s are in service as of 2022 with modernization to the Tu-160M2 level started in 2018. All aircraft are being modernized to the "M2" standard. Another 10 Tu-160M2 are on order.
 6950th Guards Air Base – Engels-2 (air base), Saratov Oblast
 121st Guards Heavy Bomber Aviation Regiment

Former operators

 Soviet Air Forces – aircraft were transferred to Russian and Ukrainian Air Forces after the dissolution of the Soviet Union.
 201st Heavy Bomber Aviation Division – Pryluky Air Base, Chernihiv Oblast, Ukrainian SSR
 184th Guards Heavy Bomber Aviation Regiment (GvTBAP)

 Ukrainian Air Force – inherited 19 Tu-160s from the former Soviet Union, and subsequently handed over 8 Tu-160s to Russia as exchange for gas debt relief in 1999; the remainder were scrapped under the Nunn–Lugar Cooperative Threat Reduction agreement led by the US.
 201st Heavy Bomber Aviation Division – Pryluky Air Base, Chernihiv Oblast, Ukraine
 184th Guards Heavy Bomber Aviation Regiment (GvTBAP)
 1 Tu-160 in the Poltava Museum of Long-Range and Strategic Aviation

Specifications (Tu-160)

See also

References

Notes

Bibliography
 The Directory of the World's Weapons. Leicester, UK: Blitz Editions, 1996. .
 
 Jackson, Paul. Jane's All The World's Aircraft 2003–2004. Coulsdon, UK: Jane's Information Group, 2003. .
 
 Taylor, Michael J. H. Brassey's World Aircraft & Systems Directory. London: Brassey's, 1996. .

External links

 Tu-160 page at GlobalSecurity.org
 

Tu-0160
1980s Soviet bomber aircraft
Quadjets
Low-wing aircraft
Variable-sweep-wing aircraft
Aircraft first flown in 1981
Supersonic aircraft
Strategic bombers